Ernest Abner Hartsock was one of the best-known American poets of the 1920s. He published three volumes of poetry and served as a Professor of Poetics at Oglethorpe University in Atlanta, GA.  Suffering from pernicious anemia, Hartsock died on December 14, 1930, at the age of 27.

Early years and education
Hartsock was born on May 5, 1903, in Atlanta, GA.  He was educated at Boys High School (later Grady High School) in Atlanta and earned BA and MA degrees from Emory University, where he was a member of the Kappa Sigma fraternity.  After graduation, he became an instructor at Georgia School of Technology in 1927 before becoming Professor of Poetics at Oglethorpe in 1929, where he taught until his death.

Arts and poetry
Hartsock's volumes of poetry were: Romance and Stardust (1925); Narcissus and Iscariot (1927); and Strange Splendor (1930).  In 1929 he was awarded the annual award of excellence by the Poetry Society of America for "Strange Splendor," the first Atlantan to ever be so recognized.   Hartsock was also founder, owner, and editor of the Bozart Press, a press devoted to the publication of poetry.
An accomplished musician, Hartsock served as organist for the Palace Theater in Atlanta for four years.

Death and legacy
Hartsock died on December 14, 1930, at the age of 27.

A life-size bronze bust of Hartsock by famed sculptor Fritz Zimmer currently resides in the Philip Weltner Library at Oglethorpe University.  Another smaller, plaster bust of Hartsock made by Atlanta poet Blossom Tucker is held in the Oglethorpe University Archives.

References

Selected bibliography
Hartosck, E. A. (1922, April). Mysterium. Emory Phoenix, 37(6), 267-268.
Hartosck, E. A. (1922, October). Cadences & Rhymes. Emory Phoenix, 38(1), 17-18.
Hartosck, E. A. (1922, October). The Call Beyond. Emory Phoenix, 38(1), 6.
Hartosck, E. A. (1922, December). Tunes by Pan. Emory Phoenix, 38(3), 124.
Hartosck, E. A. (1923, March). Interesting Contemporary Poets. Emory Phoenix, 38(5), 199-201.
Hartsock, E. A. (1925). Romance and stardust. Saugus, MA: CAA Parker.
Hartosck, E. A. (1925, October). Amaryllis. Emory Phoenix, 41(1), 28.
Hartosck, E. A. (1925, October). Ernest Talks. Emory Phoenix, 41(1), 11-12.
Hartosck, E. A. (1925, October). Florida Sketches. Emory Phoenix, 41(1), 4.
Hartosck, E. A. (1925, December). Certainty. Emory Phoenix, 41(2), 29.
Hartosck, E. A. (1925, December). Dream by Moonlight. Emory Phoenix, 41(2), 24.
Hartosck, E. A. (1925, December). Ernest Talks. Emory Phoenix, 41(2), 11-13.
Hartosck, E. A. (1925, December). For a Dead Love. Emory Phoenix, 41(2), 10. [Poem signed E. H.]
Hartosck, E. A. (1925, December). Vampire. Emory Phoenix, 41(2), 6.
Hartosck, E. A. (1926, January–February). Epitaph for Job. Emory Phoenix, 41(3), 27.
Hartosck, E. A. (1926, January–February). Ernest Talks. Emory Phoenix, 41(3), 12-16.
Hartosck, E. A. (1926, January–February). To a Friend. Emory Phoenix, 41(3), 20.
Hartosck, E. A. (1926, April). Epitaph for Nero. Emory Phoenix, 41(5), 6.
Hartosck, E. A. (1926, April). Ernest Talks. Emory Phoenix, 41(5), 14-16.
Hartosck, E. A. (1926, April). God, the Soviet. Emory Phoenix, 41(5), 13.
Hartosck, E. A. (1926, April). Philosophy. Emory Phoenix, 41(5), 24.
Hartosck, E. A. (1926, May). Epitaph for Chaucer's Prioress. Emory Phoenix, 41(6), 17.
Hartosck, E. A. (1926, May). Epitaph for Falstaff. Emory Phoenix, 41(6), 28.
Hartosck, E. A. (1926, May). The Heard Silence. Emory Phoenix, 41(6), 13.
Hartsock, E. A. (1927). Narcissus and Iscariot. Atlanta, GA: Bozart Press.
Hartsock, E. A. (1928). The future of poetry. In L. Trent, R. Cheyney, & B. Musser (Eds.), How to profit from that impulse: A symposium on contemporary poetic practice and the creative process (p. 25). New York, NY: Dean & Company.
Hartsock, E. A. (1928, October 3). Literary Epitaphs [For Mr. Babbitt; For (Mr. Erskine's) Galahad; For Elmer Gantry, Jr.]. Nation, 127(3300), 321.
Hartsock, E. A. (1928, December). Foolish Virgins. Opportunity: A Journal of Negro Life, 361.
Hartsock, E. A. (1929). Madonna in Flanders. In Graham, Marcus (Ed.), An Anthology of Revolutionary Poetry. New York, NY: Active Press, Inc.
Hartsock, E. A. (1929, February). In defense of punning. American Speech, 4(3), 224-227.
Hartsock, E. A. (1929, July). Roses in the desert: A view of contemporary southern verse. Sewanee Review, 37(3), 328-338.
Hartsock, E. A. (1929, November). Two Sonnets. Voices, 50, 185.
Hartsock, E. A. (1930). Strange splendor. Atlanta, GA: Bozart Press.
Hartosck, E. A. (1931). Warning to poets. The Personalist, 12(3), 165.

External links 
Stuart A. Rose Manuscript, Archives, and Rare Book Library, Emory University: Ernest Hartsock papers, 1921-1931
Finding Aid for Atlanta History Center's Ernest Hartsock Letters Collection

Further reading 
Arnold, E. (2022, February 8). Ernest Hartsock. New Georgia Encyclopedia.
Arnold, E. (2021, March 26). Ernest Hartsock: Poet, Publisher, and Critic. Revival: Lost Southern Voices.  
Moody, M. H. (1931, July–September). On the death of a young poet: The work of Ernest Hartsock. Sewanee Review, 39(3), 358-365.
Musser, B. F. (1931). Ernest Hartsock: An Appreciation. Landover, MD: Dreamland Press.
Rainey, G. W. (1958). Strange splendor in the Sahara of the Bozart. Emory University Quarterly, 14, 82-92.
Roper, J. (1984). First breath of Renascence—Ernest Hartsock and Bozart. Pembroke Magazine, 16, 68-73.
Rorty, J. (1929). Life's delicate children. Nation, 128 (3328), 470-1.
Swilley, M. F. (1969, March). Ernest Hartsock and His Bozart Magazine.  Georgia Historical Quarterly, 53(1), 57-67.

1903 births
1930 deaths
People from Atlanta
Oglethorpe University faculty
Emory University alumni
Georgia Tech faculty
20th-century American poets